The Sarah Millican Television Programme is a British comedic television show hosted by comedian Sarah Millican. The show's central theme is a comical review of television programming (particularly British television). Each edition features as a topic a different genre of television; Millican would lampoon the topic genre in monologue segments that were intercut with jocular interviews of celebrities known for work within that genre.  Three series of the show were broadcast between early 2012 and late 2013. A pilot episode was filmed on 25 May 2011, but never broadcast.

Filmed at Dock10, MediaCityUK in Salford in late 2011, the show was a co-production between So Television and Millican's own company, Chopsy Productions.

Episodes

Series 1

Christmas Special 2012
A Christmas special was announced after series 1 had finished.

Series 2
On 27 April 2012, it was announced that BBC Two had ordered a second series of the show, due to start on 15 January 2013.

Series 3 
Series 3 began on Tuesday 24 September 2013, along with extended 40-minute repeats entitled "The Sarah Millican Slightly Longer Television Programme".

Christmas Special 2013

DVD release
A "Best Of Series 1 and 2" DVD was released on 11 November 2013 by 4DVD. However, Series 3 and its Christmas special have never been released on DVD.

References

External links

2012 British television series debuts
2013 British television series endings
2010s British comedy television series
BBC television comedy
British stand-up comedy television series
English-language television shows
Television series by ITV Studios